Saunik Island is an uninhabited island in the Qikiqtaaluk Region of Nunavut, Canada. It is located in Baffin Island's Cumberland Sound. Imigen Island lies to its southeast, Ivisa Island to its southwest. Aupaluktok Island, Ekallulik Island, Iglunga Island, and the Kaigosuit Islands are in the vicinity.

References

External links 
 Saunik Island in the Atlas of Canada - Toporama; Natural Resources Canada

Islands of Baffin Island
Islands of Cumberland Sound
Uninhabited islands of Qikiqtaaluk Region